Events from the year 1999 in the United Kingdom. This year is noted for the first meetings of the new Scottish Parliament and National Assembly for Wales.

Incumbents
Monarch – Elizabeth II 
Prime Minister – Tony Blair (Labour)
Parliament – 52nd

Events

January
 January – Vauxhall launches a facelifted Vectra to improve its disappointing ride and build quality.
 1 January – The Euro currency is launched, but Britain's Labour government reportedly has no plans to introduce the currency here, preferring to stick to pound sterling instead.
 13 January – Unemployment has fallen to just over 1,300,000 – the lowest for 20 years.
 30 January – England national football team manager Glenn Hoddle gives an interview to The Times newspaper in which he suggests that people born with disabilities are paying for sins in a previous life.

February
 1 February - Allan Clark joined one of the UK's largest banking firms
 2 February – The Football Association dismisses Glenn Hoddle as England manager due to the controversy sparked by his comments about disabled people.
 12 February – Scientists at the Rowett Research Institute in Aberdeen reinforce warnings that genetically modified food may be damaging to the human body.
 22 February – Harold Shipman, the Hyde GP accused of murdering eight female patients last September, is charged with a further seven murders.
 24 February – The report of the murder of black London teenager Stephen Lawrence, who was stabbed to death in 1993, condemns London's police force as "institutionally racist", as well as condemning its officers for "fundamental errors".

March
 2 March – Singer Dusty Springfield, who received an OBE last month, dies aged 59 at Henley-on-Thames after a five-year battle against breast cancer.
 7 March – American-born film director Stanley Kubrick dies at his home in St Albans, Hertfordshire, of a heart attack aged 70, five days after completing his final film Eyes Wide Shut, which is released in July.
 16 March – The NSPCC launches its new 'full stop' advertising campaign which shows different objects of childhood heroes shielding their eyes as voices were heard being abused they want everyone to prevent cruelty, it was broadcast after the 9.00pm watershed behind its disturbing problem as shock tactics needed to break people's complacency. This advertisement is part of the largest campaign ever undertaken by a charity and the beginning of a long-term strategy to end violence against children.
 17 March – Comedian and entertainer Rod Hull is accidentally killed in a fall aged 63 outside his home in Winchelsea, Sussex, after trying to adjust his television aerial.
 21 March – Comedian Ernie Wise, who formed one-half of the Morecambe and Wise comedy double from 1941 to 1984, dies of a heart attack aged 73 at Wexham, Buckinghamshire.
 24 March – Ross Kemp, who has achieved TV stardom with his role as Grant Mitchell in EastEnders, signs a £1million deal with ITV, meaning that he will leave EastEnders this autumn after nearly 10 years.
 26 March – A total £2 billion in compensation is paid to 100,000 former miners who are suffering from lung disease after years of working in British coalfields.
 29 March – The family of James Hanratty, one of the last men to be executed in Britain (for the A6 murder 37 years ago), are given the right to appeal against his conviction by the Criminal Cases Review Commission.

April
 April – Vauxhall launches its Zafira, a compact MPV which makes use of the Astra hatchback's chassis.
 1 April
 A minimum wage is introduced throughout the UK – set at £3.60 an hour for workers over 21, and £3 for workers under 21.
 Anthony Sawoniuk, 78, becomes the first person convicted of Second World War crimes in a British court when he is sentenced to life imprisonment for the murder of 18 Jews in his native Belarus. He has lived in Britain since 1947.
 6 April - Gaurav born (Yahoo!)
 14 April – Edgar Pearce, the so-called "Mardi Gra bomber", convicted for a series of bombings and sentenced to 21 years in jail.
 17 April – A bomb explodes in Brixton, South West London, and injures 45 people.
 24 April – A second bomb explosion in Brick Lane, east London injures 13 people.
 26 April – TV presenter Jill Dando, 37, dies after being shot on the doorstep of her Fulham home.
 30 April – A third bomb in London explodes in the Admiral Duncan pub, in Old Compton Street, Soho, London – the centre of the London gay scene – killing two people (including a pregnant woman) and injuring over thirty. David Copeland, a 23-year-old Farnborough man, is arrested hours later in connection with the three explosions.

May
 3 May – David Copeland appears in court charged with the recent bombings in London.
 6 May
 1999 Scottish Parliament election – The first elections to the Scottish Parliament.
 1999 National Assembly for Wales election – The first elections to the Welsh Assembly.
 7 May – The Labour Party and the Liberal Democrats form a coalition government in Scotland, with Donald Dewar as the First Minister of Scotland.
 12 May – The Scottish Parliament meets in Edinburgh for its first session.
 19 May – Probably the last colliery horse to work underground in a British coal mine is retired, 'Robbie' at Pant y Gasseg drift mine, near Pontypool.
 21 May – Jill Dando is buried in her hometown of Weston-super-Mare.
 26 May – Manchester United come from behind to beat Bayern Munich, with two late goals in the UEFA Champions League final in Camp Nou, Barcelona. They are the first English club in history to win the Treble of Premier League, FA Cup and European Cup.
 26 May – The National Assembly for Wales meets in Cardiff for its first session.
 31 May – The Princess Royal opens the new Midland Metro tram service in the West Midlands, which runs on a 15-mile route mostly consisting of former railway lines between Birmingham and Wolverhampton.

June
 8 June – Former cabinet minister Jonathan Aitken is sentenced to 18 months prison for perjury.
 10 June – The European parliament elections are held. The Conservatives enjoy their best performance in any election since the 1992 general election by gaining 36 seats compared to Labour's 29 – a stark contrast to the previous European elections five years ago where they had a mere 18 MEP's compared to Labour's 62.
 10 June – At the Leeds Central by-election, Hilary Benn holds the seat for the Labour Party.#
 12 June – The Queen's Birthday Honours are announced. They include a knighthood for the Manchester United manager Alex Ferguson and the ITV newsreader Trevor McDonald.
 14 June – Conservative leader William Hague hails his party's strong European election results as vindication of his party's opposition to the single European currency.
 16 June – David Sutch, the founder of the Official Monster Raving Loony Party, is found hanged at his home in Harrow. He was 58.
 17 June – Cardinal Basil Hume, leader of the Roman Catholic Church in England and Wales, dies of cancer aged 76 barely two months after the illness was diagnosed.
 18 June – Police clash with protesters at a demonstration against capitalism in London.
 19 June – The wedding of Prince Edward and Sophie Rhys-Jones takes place at St George's Chapel, Windsor. Prior to the marriage, the Queen creates Prince Edward, her third and youngest son, Earl of Wessex and Viscount Severn.
 22 June – Patrick Magee is released from prison under the Good Friday Agreement, 14 years into his life sentence for the Provisional Irish Republican Army bombing at the Grand Hotel in Brighton, which killed five people during the Conservative Party conference on 12 October 1984.
 23 June
 Fears about the future of the Rover Group's Longbridge plant in Birmingham are calmed by the news that owner BMW is to invest £2.5billion in the plant.
 Construction of the Millennium Dome is finished.
 26 June – The Millennium Stadium, national sports stadium for Wales, is opened in Cardiff.
 30 June – Manchester United announce that they will not compete in the FA Cup in the forthcoming football season so they can concentrate on their participation in the FIFA World Club Championship in Brazil at the start of the next year. Their decision is seen as a major boost to England's hopes of hosting the 2006 World Cup.

July
 1 July 
 The Scottish Parliament is officially opened by Queen Elizabeth II of the United Kingdom on the day that devolved powers are officially transferred from the Scottish Office in London to the new devolved Scottish Executive in Edinburgh.
 William Whitelaw, 1st Viscount Whitelaw, deputy prime minister under Margaret Thatcher, dies at the age of 81 in Penrith.
 4 July – Rogue trader Nick Leeson returns home to England from Singapore, nearly four years after he was jailed there after his illegal dealings led to the collapse of Barings Bank with losses of £850million.
 5 July – Chelsea pay a club record of £10million (one of the highest fees paid by any English club) for the Blackburn Rovers striker Chris Sutton.
 9 July – Neil Kinnock, who was Labour Party leader from 1983 to 1992 while they were in opposition, is appointed vice-president of the European Commission.
 22 July – At the Eddisbury by-election, Stephen O'Brien holds the seat for the Conservative Party.

August
 4 August 
 George Robertson appointed as Secretary General of NATO.
 The JJB Stadium opens in Wigan, to serve the town's football and rugby teams.
 9 August – Charles Kennedy elected as Leader of the Liberal Democrats.
 11 August – The solar eclipse attracts the attention of 350,000,000 people across Europe, with Cornwall being the only region of Britain to experience totality.
 20 August – A MORI poll shows Labour support at 49%, giving them a 22-point lead over the Conservatives. However, it is the first time since their election win over two years ago that they have polled at less than 50% in the poll by the leading market research company.
 22 August – Norfolk farmer Tony Martin, 54, is charged with the murder of a sixteen-year-old burglar who was shot dead at his home two days ago. He is also charged with wounding a 29-year-old man who was also present at the time of the burglary.

September
 September
 Rover launches the 25 and 45. Nissan launches a facelifted Primera to be built by Nissan Motor Manufacturing UK.
 Meningococcal vaccine against meningitis for young people begins rollout.
 5 September – Bobby Robson, the 66-year-old former England manager, is appointed as Newcastle United's new manager. He is nearly 30 years older than his predecessor Ruud Gullit.
 9 September – Chris Patten's report recommends reform of Royal Ulster Constabulary.
 23 September – At the Hamilton South by-election, Bill Tynan holds the seat for the Labour Party.
 23 September – At the Wigan by-election, Neil Turner holds the seat for the Labour Party.
 24 September – The Royal Bank of Scotland launches a hostile takeover bid for the NatWest Bank.
 27 September – The Midland Bank adopts the name of its owner HSBC, marking an end of the Midland Bank name after 163 years.
 27 September – The Kosovo Train for Life aid train arrives in Kosovo after 4,500-kilometre journey from the United Kingdom

October
 October – The government distributes to all household a booklet concerning the Year 2000 problem, What everyone should know about the Millennium Bug.
 1 October – The Rugby World Cup begins in the Millennium Stadium, Cardiff.
 5 October
 The Ladbroke Grove rail crash claims the lives of 31 people when two trains collide at Ladbroke Grove Junction, 2 miles west of Paddington station, London. Many more people are being treated in hospital for injuries.
 Harold Shipman goes on trial at Preston Crown Court accused of murdering 15 female patients who died in the Greater Manchester area between 1995 and 1998.
 10 October – The London Eye begins to be lifted into position on the South Bank in London.
 16 October – 26 players are sent off in Premier League and Football League matches on the same day – the most dismissals on the same day in 111 years of league football in England.
 19 October – Tracey Emin exhibits My Bed at the Tate Gallery as one of the shortlisted works for the Turner Prize.
 20 October – Sales of Rover cars are reported to have fallen by 30% this year.

November
 2 November – Ford Motor Company takes over Jaguar in a £1.6billion deal.
 11 November – House of Lords Act 1999 removes most hereditary peers from the House of Lords. Those no longer sitting in the Lords are now eligible to vote in elections for the House of Commons.
 12 November – Former glam rock singer Gary Glitter, 54, is jailed for four months at Bristol Crown Court for downloading child pornography. He is cleared at this hearing of having unlawful sex with a teenage fan 20 years ago, but will subsequently be charged in several countries for sexual offences involving minors, culminating in 2015 with a 16-year sentence imposed in the UK.
 17 November – England qualify for the UEFA Euro 2000 football championship with a 2–1 aggregate win over Scotland in the qualifying playoff round.
 25 November – At the Kensington and Chelsea by-election, Michael Portillo holds the seat for the Conservative Party.
 30 November – BAE Systems formed by merger of British Aerospace and Marconi Electronic Systems.

December
 10 December – Launch of the European Space Agency's XMM-Newton satellite. Information from the satellite is processed at the University of Leicester.
 30 December – Former Beatle George Harrison, 56, suffers stab wounds after being attacked by an intruder at Friar Park, his mansion near Henley-on-Thames in Oxfordshire.
 31 December – Millennium celebrations are held across the country including the official opening of the Millennium Dome and the unveiling of the London Eye in London.

Undated
 Main construction work on Cardiff Bay Barrage completed.
 More than 20% of the UK population (over 12 million people) now have internet access.

Publications
 Iain Banks' novel The Business.
 Lauren Child's children's book Clarice Bean, That's Me, first in the Clarice Bean series.
 Julia Donaldson's children's book The Gruffalo.
 Jamie Oliver's television tie-in cookbook The Naked Chef.
 Terry Pratchett's Discworld novel The Fifth Elephant.
 J. K. Rowling's children's fantasy novel Harry Potter and the Prisoner of Azkaban.

Births

 2 January
Dennis Adeniran, footballer
Aidan Wilson, footballer
 10 January – Mason Mount, footballer
 14 January – Declan Rice, English footballer
 20 January – Flynn Downes, footballer
 24 January – Jamie Barjonas, footballer
 31 January – Alice Tai, swimmer
 2 February – Marcus McGuane, footballer
 5 February – Arthur Chatto, son of Lady Sarah Chatto and Daniel Chatto
 8 February 
 Morgan Feeney, footballer
 Alessia Russo, footballer
 9 February – Adrianna Bertola, actress
 15 February – George Hirst, footballer
 19 February – Georgia Coates, swimmer
 22 February – Harry Brook, cricketer
 1 March – Ryan Porteous, footballer
 4 March – Brooklyn Beckham, footballer
 22 March – Marcus Tavernier, footballer
 4 April – Sheku Kanneh-Mason, cellist
 12 April – Akai Osei, street dancer
 18 April
Ben Brereton, footballer
Liam Trevaskis, cricketer
 19 April – Bethany Shriever, BMX racer
 24 April – Jonathan Leko, footballer
 2 May – Andre Dozzell, footballer
 6 May – Sophie Ecclestone, cricketer
 7 May
 Tommy Fury, boxer and TV personality
 Fraser Murray, footballer
 22 May – Josh Tymon, footballer
 26 May
 Molly-Mae Hague, social media personality
 Kerry Ingram, actress
 30 May – Eddie Nketiah, footballer
 2 June – Felix Organ, Australian-born English cricketer
 3 June – Liam Banks, cricketer
 23 June – Noah Marullo, actor
 1 July – Charles Armstrong-Jones, son of Viscount Linley and Viscountess Linley
 14 July – Scott Twine, footballer
 20 July – Ellie Downie, gymnast
 20 August – Joe Willock, footballer
 21 August – Henry Brookes, cricketer
 24 August – Lewis Ferguson, footballer
 27 August – Jack Plom, cricketer
 28 August – Kyle Taylor, footballer
 4 September – Ellie Darcey-Alden, actress 
 13 September – Fraser Hornby, footballer
 14 October – Daniel Roche, actor
 15 October – Ben Woodburn, footballer
 20 October – Connor Marsh, actor
 24 October – Dujon Sterling, footballer
 4 November – Ben Wilmot, footballer
 6 November – Tristan Nydam, footballer
 13 November – Lando Norris, racing driver
 14 November 
 Ellis Hollins, actor
 Jude Wright, actor
 8 December – Reece James, footballer
 10 December – Reiss Nelson, footballer
 Undated – Freya Wilson, actress

Deaths

 4 January – Charles Manners, 10th Duke of Rutland, peer (born 1919)
 11 January – Naomi Mitchison, Scottish novelist and poet (born 1897)
 12 January – Leslie French, actor (born 1904)
 3 February – Arthur Mann, footballer and coach (born 1945)
 8 February – Iris Murdoch, novelist and philosopher (born 1919)
 9 February
 Bryan Mosley, actor (born 1931)
 Ann West, media campaigner (born 1929)
 20 February – Sarah Kane, playwright (born 1971)
 23 February – David Chilton Phillips, biologist (born 1924)
 24 February 
 Derek Nimmo, actor (accident) (born 1930)
 David Eccles, 1st Viscount Eccles, politician (born 1904)
 2 March – Dusty Springfield, singer (born 1939)
 5 March – Tom Denning, Baron Denning, judge (born 1899)
 6 March – Dennis Viollet, footballer (born 1933); died in the United States
 7 March – Stanley Kubrick, film director (born 1928 in the United States)
 9 March – Arnold Machin, artist, coin and stamp designer (born 1911)
 17 March – Rod Hull, entertainer (accident) (born 1935)
 21 March – Ernie Wise, comedian (born 1925)
 3 April – Lionel Bart, composer (born 1930)
 4 April – Bob Peck, actor (born 1945)
 14 April – Anthony Newley, actor, singer and songwriter (born 1931)
 26 April – Jill Dando, journalist and television presenter (murdered) (born 1961)
 28 April – Sir Alf Ramsey, footballer and manager (born 1920)
 2 May – Oliver Reed, actor (born 1938)
 6 May – Johnny Morris, television presenter (born 1916)
 8 May – Dirk Bogarde, actor and author (born 1921)
 19 May – James Blades, orchestral percussionist (born 1901)
 1 June – Christopher Cockerell, inventor (born 1910)
 8 June – Christina Foyle, bookshop owner (born 1911)
 16 June – David Sutch ("Screaming Lord Sutch"), musician and founder of the Official Monster Raving Loony Party (suicide) (born 1940)
 17 June – Cardinal Basil Hume, Archbishop of Westminster (since 1976) (born 1923)
 23 June – Buster Merryfield, actor (born 1920)
 1 July – William Whitelaw, 1st Viscount Whitelaw, politician (born 1918) 
 12 July – Bill Owen, actor (born 1914)
 21 July – David Ogilvy, businessman (born 1911)
 9 August
 Bob Herbert, original manager of the Spice Girls (car accident) (born 1942)
 Helen Rollason, television sports presenter (born 1956)
 10 August – Jennifer Paterson, television chef, one half of the Two Fat Ladies (born 1928)
 15 August – Hugh Casson, architect, writer and artist (born 1910)
 5 September – Alan Clark, Conservative Member of Parliament and former government minister (born 1928)
 14 September – Charles Crichton, film director and film editor (born 1910)
 17 September – Frankie Vaughan, singer and actor (born 1928)
 7 October – Deryck Guyler, actor (born 1914)
 15 October – Josef Locke, tenor (born 1917 in Northern Ireland); died in Ireland
 3 November – Ian Bannen, Scottish actor (car accident) (born 1928)
 11 November – Vivian Fuchs, explorer (born 1908)
 21 November – Quentin Crisp, writer and raconteur (born 1908)
 24 November – Hilary Minster, actor (born 1944)
 6 December – Alexander Baron, author and screenwriter (born 1917)
 7 December – Kenny Baker, jazz trumpeter (born 1921)
 8 December – Rupert Hart-Davis, publisher (born 1907)
 13 December – Jill Craigie, filmmaker and screenwriter (born 1911)
 19 December – Desmond Llewelyn, actor (born 1914)
 23 December – Martin Charteris, Baron Charteris of Amisfield, Army officer and courtier of Queen Elizabeth II (born 1913)
 25 December – Peter Jeffrey, actor (born 1929)

See also
 1999 in British music
 1999 in British television
 List of British films of 1999

References

 
Years of the 20th century in the United Kingdom
United Kingdom